Magnesium laureth sulfate is the magnesium salt of laureth sulfate (2-dodecoxyethylsulfate), which is in turn the ester of laureth (2-dodecoxylethanol) and sulfuric acid.  It is used mainly in the chemical industry for the preparation of specialized shampoos for people of delicate skin. It works even in hard water.

See also
 Sodium laureth sulfate

Ethers
Magnesium compounds
Anionic surfactants
Sulfate esters